Delovo is a rural locality (a village) in Novlyanskoye Rural Settlement, Selivanovsky District, Vladimir Oblast, Russia. The population was 86 as of 2010. There are 3 streets.

Geography 
Delovo is located 11 km south of Krasnaya Gorbatka (the district's administrative centre) by road. Parshovo is the nearest rural locality.

References 

Rural localities in Selivanovsky District
Muromsky Uyezd